Gabriela Soukalová, formerly Koukalová (born 1 November 1989 in Jablonec nad Nisou, Czechoslovakia) is a former Czech biathlete and television presenter for TV Prima. She won three Olympic medals at the 2014 Sochi Games and she is a two-time World Championship winner, gold medalist at the 2015 Kontiolahti in mixed relay and gold medalist at 2017 Hochfilzen in 7.5 km sprint. In the 2015/2016 World Cup season she was overall champion, and she has also taken six discipline Crystal Globes: the 2013/2014 individual title, the 2015/2016 sprint, pursuit and mass-start titles, and the 2016/17 sprint and mass start titles.

Career
Soukalová began her biathlon career in 2005. In 2007 Soukalová became a member of the national team, and in 2008 she took part in the Biathlon Junior World Championship. Her first experience at the international level was not very good: Soukalová's shooting accuracy and ski speed were at that time not as strong as many of her peers, and her best result at the 2008 Junior Worlds was a 22nd place. Nevertheless, her coaches gave her a chance to take part in further international competitions, including the IBU Cup in the 2008/09 season. Her performances improved: Soukalová, despite some difficulties in shooting, became better than Olga Vilukhina and helped the Czech women's relay team to win a gold at the 2009 Junior World Championships.

Soukalová made her debut on the Biathlon World Cup in December 2009. Her coaches subsequently made the decision to move her back down to the IBU Cup, but her period at that level was relatively brief after she regularly took good results and won a silver medal in the sprint at the 2011 European Championships. She was selected to represent the Czech Republic in the World Cup and at the 2010 Winter Olympics.

Her first significant success was in December 2011: in a World Cup mixed relay in Austria she helped to secure the Czech team second place. During the 2012–13 season she took four wins in the Biathlon World Cup. She added three more wins in the 2013–14 World Cup season. At the 2014 Winter Olympics, she finished fourth in both the 10 km pursuit and 15 km individual before winning silver medals in both the 12.5 km mass start and mixed relay (together with Veronika Vítková, Jaroslav Soukup and Ondřej Moravec).

At the World Championships 2015 in Kontiolahti Soukalová took her first world championship title in the mixed relay as a member of the successful Czech team. In the sprint race she took 18th place with three penalties, but in the pursuit she was able to climb to fifth place. In the individual race Soukalová won a silver medal, which became her second medal at these World Championships. At the final World Cup meeting of the season in Khanty-Mansiysk Soukalová managed to win a silver medal in the mass start. In the final overall World Cup rankings for 2014/15, she finished in sixth place with 752 points.

In the 2015/2016 season put in strong performances: at the fifth round of the World Cup on 4 January 2016, even two missed targets did not prevent her from making the podium. Gabriela showed good consistency, finishing no lower than 11th place during the season, and continued to lead the World Cup standings. In the 12.5 km mass start on 16 January 2016 she won and got her tenth victory in the Biathlon World Cup. She also helped to win a silver for the team in the 4x6 km relay on 24 January 2016, and took a third place in the mass start in Canada on 6 February 2016. In the US at Presque Isle on 11 February 2016 in sprint, she got the best result showing perfect accuracy and an excellent performance. The following days brought two gold medals in the 10 km pursuit and 4x6 km relay. Despite some poorer results in Norway, Soukalová took a better result in the sprint in Khanty-Mansiysk in Russia on 17 March 2016 clinching her the small Crystal Globe in the sprint  with a total of 413 points. On the next day in the pursuit she got a fourth place, but with a very good level both in speed and shooting. She also took a second small Crystal Globe in the mass start with 241 points. She led the standings in the 2015/2016 World Cup from start to finish, and won the overall Crystal Globe on 20 March 2016 with a final score of 1074 points.

The 2016/2017 season started in Östersund, Sweden on 27 November 2016, where she and her teammates took 7th place in the mixed relay. The 15 km race on 30 November 2016 brought a 17th place, but later on, on 3 December 2016, she took third place in the 7.5 km sprint, and the next day she showed even better results - winning the pursuit, showing an excellent performance both in skiing and shooting. The next medal (first place) was taken in a mass start race on December 18, 2016.

On 21 December 2017 she became the first biathlete to be named Czech Sportsperson of the Year. Due to a leg injury she did not start in the 2017/2018 season, and later revealed that she will possibly not return to the World Cup ever again. On 28 May 2019 she announced her retirement.

Personal life
She is the daughter of Gabriela Svobodová, a former cross-country skier, who won an Olympic silver medal in the 4 x 5 km relay at Sarajevo in 1984. Later, her mother helps as a personal trainer.

In summer 2014, Soukalová started dating Czech professional badminton player Petr Koukal. They married on 13 May 2016, in the historic unfinished church in Panenský Týnec. They divorced in September or October 2020.

In April 2018 she published her autobiography Jiná (meaning Different), in which she revealed a long history of eating disorders.

In December 2020 Soukalová posed for Czech version of Playboy magazine and charity calendar. On 1 March 2021 Soukalová announced her pregnancy with her new partner Miloš Kadeřábek and return to her birth name.

Biathlon results
All results are sourced from the International Biathlon Union.

Olympic Games
 3 medals (2 silver, 1 bronze)

a.  The mixed relay was added as an event in 2014.

World Championships
 6 medals (2 gold, 2 silver, 2 bronze)

a.  During Olympic seasons competitions are only held for those events not included in the Olympic program.

World Cup

Individual victories
 17 victories – (7 , 4 , 2 , 4 )

Relay victories
 6 victories – (4 , 2 )

Overall record

* Results in all UIPMB and IBU World Cup races, Olympics and World Championships. Statistics as of 19 March 2017.

Shooting

* Results in all IBU World Cup races, Olympics and World Championships including relay events and disqualified races. Statistics as of 20 March 2018.

References

External links

Gabriela Soukalova at Getty Images

1989 births
Czech female biathletes
Biathletes at the 2010 Winter Olympics
Biathletes at the 2014 Winter Olympics
Olympic biathletes of the Czech Republic
Medalists at the 2014 Winter Olympics
Olympic medalists in biathlon
Olympic silver medalists for the Czech Republic
Biathlon World Championships medalists
Czech people of Slovak descent
Sportspeople from Jablonec nad Nisou
Living people